The statue of Franklin D. Roosevelt is installed in Chapultepec, Mexico City, Mexico. This portrayal of Roosevelt is unusual because he suffered from paralytic illness and was unable to walk unaided after his 1920 campaign for vice president. The statue is found close to the National Museum of Anthropology. It was made by Mexican sculpturist Jorge de la Peña Beltrán.

See also
 List of memorials to Franklin D. Roosevelt
 List of sculptures of presidents of the United States
 List of statues of Franklin D. Roosevelt

References

Bibliography

External links

 

Chapultepec
Monuments and memorials in Mexico City
Monuments and memorials to Franklin D. Roosevelt
Outdoor sculptures in Mexico City
Sculptures of men in Mexico
Statues in Mexico City
Works by Mexican people